Francis Lucius "Babe" Kraus Sr. (September 2, 1899 – September 5, 1966) was an American football and lacrosse player and coach. After a college football career that included stops at Colgate University and Hobart and William Smith Colleges, Kraus played for the Buffalo Bisons  of the National Football League  (NFL) in 1924. Kraus served as the head football coach at his alma mater, Hobart, from 1932 to 1933. However, his biggest mark was left when he served as the school's head lacrosse coach from 1925 to 1966.

References

External links
 

1899 births
1966 deaths
American football tackles
American football guards
American men's basketball coaches
Basketball coaches from New York (state)
Basketball players from New York (state)
Buffalo Bisons (NFL) players
Colgate Raiders football players
College men's basketball head coaches in the United States
Hobart Statesmen basketball coaches
Hobart Statesmen football coaches
Hobart Statesmen football players
Hobart Statesmen lacrosse players
Lacrosse players from New York (state)
Players of American football from New York (state)